Anarta colletti is a species of moth belonging to the family Noctuidae.

It is native to Norway.

References

Noctuidae
Moths described in 1876